Richard Conn (born January 9, 1951) is a former professional American football defensive back who played safety for six seasons for the Pittsburgh Steelers and New England Patriots of the National Football League (NFL). With the Steelers, he won Super Bowl IX over the Minnesota Vikings. He attended the University of Georgia, where he played as a defensive back for the Georgia Bulldogs.

References

1951 births
Living people
American football safeties
Georgia Bulldogs football players
Pittsburgh Steelers players
New England Patriots players
Players of American football from Louisville, Kentucky